The Wolseley 18/85 is an automobile which was produced by Wolseley in the United Kingdom from 1938 until 1948.

Introduced in 1938, the 18/85 was built on a  wheelbase, and was powered by an 85 bhp, twin carburettor, overhead valve, inline six-cylinder engine, which it shared with the MG SA. Post-war production of the model began in the autumn of 1945 and totalled 8213 vehicles.

Achievements
An 18/85 driven by Humphrey Symons and Bertie Browning set a London to Cape Town record of 31 days 22 hours, completing the 10,300 mile journey on 21 January 1939. The time included a 12-day break for repairs following a plunge into the Gada River in the Belgian Congo. Bertie Browning kept a handwritten diary during the trip.

Wolseley 18/85 of 1967 to 1972
The 18/85 model name was again used on a Wolseley from 1967 to 1972. This was a variant of the BMC ADO17, which was also marketed under Austin and Morris names.

References

18 85 (1938 to 1948)
Cars introduced in 1938
Rear-wheel-drive vehicles
Sedans
1940s cars